The Sadat Quraish Mosque is a historical mosque located in the city of Bilbeis, Egypt. Founded in 18 AH, it is considered one of the prominent Islamic monuments, as some historians believe it as the first mosque built in Egypt. Founded before the Amr ibn al-As Mosque in Fustat, it is likely the second oldest mosque in Africa.

Naming 
It was named Sadat Quraish or the Lords of the Quraysh tribe in honor of the Muslim martyrs of the Companions of the Islamic prophet Muhammad in their battle against the Romans in Belbis, where about 120 Companions were fighting of which 20-40 were martyred and buried within or around the mosque.

History 
The construction of the mosque by Amr bin Al-As in the year 18 Hijri during the Islamic conquest of Egypt, therefore the mosque of "Sadat Quraish" in Sharqia Governorate is first mosque to be built in Egypt, making it older than the mosque of Amr bin Al-As in al-Fustat city, and Al-Rahma Mosque in Alexandria. However, some sources indicate that it is the second oldest mosque in Africa after Al Nejashi Mosque in Abyssinia, which was founded by the Companions when they migrated to Abyssinia in 613.

Also, after the Battle of Karbala, Sayyidah Zaynab, the daughter of Imam Ali, saw a vision while she was in Medina that the Messenger of God ordered them to take Ahl al-Bayt to Egypt. So they were welcomed by the people of Bilbeis, and they stayed in the mosque an entire month.

The Abbasid Caliph Al-Ma'mun stayed in it for 40 days when he went down to Egypt to re-establish order, after Bashmurian revolts against the Abbasid governor Isa bin Mansour. Caliph Al-Ma'mun ordered the restoration of the mosque and that is why the mosque was called for a period of time the Al-Ma'mun Mosque.

The Sadat Quraish mosque is registered among the Islamic antiquities in the Ministerial Decree No. 10357 of the year 1951 in Eastern, it has been encroached upon and built around it. It's minaret is missing the top, fearing it's collapse in the 1970s, the top part of it was dismantled.

Design
The rectangular mosque contains 18 marble columns in three rows and is divided into four arches parallel to the Qibla walls, and the crowns of the columns are of different shapes denoting their origin from different Ancient Egyptian and Roman temples, and the square area of the mosque is about three thousand square meters. The mosque was renovated in the Ottoman era by the Emir of Egypt, Al-Kashif, who built the minaret.

References 

Mosques in Egypt